Big Creek Township is an inactive township in Madison County, in the U.S. state of Missouri.

Big Creek Township was established in 1909, taking its name from Big Creek.

References

Townships in Missouri
Townships in Madison County, Missouri